Stuart King Hill (November 8, 1936 – July 14, 2012) was an American football quarterback in the National Football League who played for the Chicago / St. Louis Cardinals, Philadelphia Eagles, and Minnesota Vikings.

Football career
After attending Brazosport High School in Freeport, Texas, Hill went to Rice Institute in Houston, splitting time as quarterback of the Owls with Frank Ryan, who also later played in the NFL. Hill was an AP All-American in 1957, led the Owls to the Southwest Conference title, and played in the Cotton Bowl on New Year's Day.

Hill was the first player selected in the 1958 NFL draft and spent over thirty-five years in professional football as a player, coach, and scout, and also as a key figure in the NFL Players Association.  Hill signed the first collective bargaining agreement in professional football and represented players for the Players Association for nine years during the 1968 strike.

Hill's accomplishments in the football community include:
 One of the last three sports letterman in major college athletics (football, basketball, and golf).
 All-American Football 1957 (quarterback)
 Captain 1957 S.W.C. Champions
 Played in the Cotton and Hula Bowls in 1958.  Captain of the college all-stars beating the world champion Detroit Lions.
 First player selected (bonus) NFL draft 1958 by the Cardinals.
 Played professional football for Chicago Cardinals, St. Louis Cardinals, Philadelphia Eagles, and the Minnesota Vikings.
 Offensive Coordinator for the Houston Oilers (1970–1980) and the New Orleans Saints (1981–1986).
 Assisted with the drafting and development of Earl Campbell.
 Established rookie NFL rushing record with George Rogers.
 Won more games than any team in the NFL during 1978–1980.
 Ranked second in total offense AFC in 1980, winning four of seven play-off games.
 Director of Scouting Western United States and Canada for the Philadelphia Eagles 1986–1992.
 Drafted and Developed play-off teams 1988–1990.
 Former member of the NFL Alumni Association.

Golf and charities
Always a skilled golfer, Hill never gave up his amateur status and through the years has participated in hundreds of tournaments, as well as being an active participant in the promotion of charitable golf tournaments in Texas and Louisiana. He also assisted in the founding and working of the Ronald McDonald Houses in Texas and Louisiana. Hill also helped with Big Brothers and other children causes in Texas, including the Special Olympics. His golf team won first place in the NFL Alumni Tournament in 1995 and 2001. He placed second in the tournament in 1996.

Death
Hill died at age 75 in 2012 after a long illness. He is buried at Forest Park Cemetery at The Woodlands.

References

External links
 
 

1936 births
2012 deaths
American football quarterbacks
Chicago Cardinals players
Minnesota Vikings players
Philadelphia Eagles players
Rice Owls football players
St. Louis Cardinals (football) players
National Football League first-overall draft picks
People from Hamilton, Texas
Players of American football from Texas